Cindy Lee is the drag queen “confrontation pop” project of Canadian musician Patrick Flegel, former guitarist and lead singer of Women.

Cindy Lee is most noted for their 2020 album What's Tonight to Eternity?, which was longlisted for the 2020 Polaris Music Prize.

Background
Following the breakup of Women in 2010, Flegel collaborated with Morgan Cook in the band Androgynous Mind, releasing the EP Nightstalker in 2012. From there, the project evolved into Cindy Lee, which sees Flegel recording music primarily alone but continuing to perform with a rotating roster of supporting musicians.

Releases
The demo cassette Tatlashea was released in 2012, followed by the full-length album Act of Tenderness in 2015. Malenkost was released later the same year, followed by a reissue of Act of Tenderness in 2018.

What's Tonight to Eternity? was released in February 2020, with its lead single "Heavy Metal" a posthumous tribute to Flegel's former Women bandmate Chris Reimer. The project's fifth album, Cat o' Nine Tails, followed in March 2020.

References

Canadian indie rock groups
Canadian experimental musical groups
Musical groups established in 2011
2011 establishments in Canada